Randy Smithson (born November 17, 1958) is an American college basketball coach. He was the head coach at Wichita State University from 1996 to 2000.

References

1958 births
Living people
American men's basketball coaches
Wichita State Shockers men's basketball coaches